Coffee cherry tea is an herbal tea  made from the dried skins and/or pulp of the fruit of the coffee plant that remain after the coffee beans have been collected from within. It is also known as cascara, from the Spanish cáscara, meaning "husk". It is similar to a traditional beverage in Yemen and Ethiopia. Starting about 2005 it was independently developed and promoted for export by Salvadoran coffee farmer Aida Batlle. The dried whole fruits are also eaten like raisins.

It is different from cáscara sagrada tea, a powerful plant-based laxative derived from Rhamnus purshiana, which is native to the Pacific Northwest.

History 

Hashara and qishr are similar drinks traditional in Ethiopia and Yemen. It is believed that cáscara tea was consumed in Yemen even before the form of coffee we know today. Outside of these traditional uses, in most coffee-producing countries the coffee fruit is usually considered a wasted byproduct of the coffee-production process. 

Independently of this traditional beverage, Salvadoran coffee farmer Aida Batlle developed a secondary market for coffee cherry skins, which are dried to create a tea she called cascara. Around 2005 she noticed the coffee cherry husks, which are commonly discarded in the milling process, had a floral aroma, and she decided to try brewing tea from them. Cascara in Spanish means skin or peel of fruit. By 2009 it was being offered as a beverage in US coffee shops. Other growers also began selling their coffee cherry pulp and skins as teas.

Increasing demand for cáscara from large U.S.-based coffee chains has, in some cases, led to the dried husks fetching higher prices than the coffee beans.

Brewing 
The husks can be dried and flaked like ground tea or dried into raisinlike pieces, both of which are prepared by steeping in hot water for a short period or cold water for a lengthy period. The resulting beverage is served hot, iced, carbonated, and bottled by various producers, including as a beer. Typical proportions call for steeping three tablespoons of dried flaked cascara in 10 to 12 ounces of hot water for four minutes or cold water for 12 to 16 hours.

Health benefits 

A study published in the Cambridge University Press showed evidence that extracts derived from coffee fruit increase BDNF  (brain-derived neurotrophic factor) in healthy subjects, likely due to its high polyphenol content, thought this was a small study involving 25 subjects and the authors note larger clinical studies are needed. A systemic research review demonstrated that polyphenol consumption may increase cognition both acutely and chronically, though comparisons between studies are hampered by methodological inconsistencies.

Coffee fruit contains caffeine. Caffeine has possible neuro-protective properties, including a possible prevention or reduction in rate of progression of dementia. Caffeine levels in cascara are similar to those found in black teas.

Forms 
It is served hot, iced, carbonated, and bottled by various producers, including in addition to a tea as a soda, a beer, a liqueur, and a flavored vodka.

The dried whole fruit is also eaten like raisins. It is also ground into a flour which can be used by those avoiding gluten.

Description 
The tea is described as fruity and floral; the fruits are described as not dissimilar to other dried fruits such as apricots, cranberries, and raisins, and the flour has a fruity flavor.

See also 
 Coffee-leaf tea

Reference 

Coffee derivatives
Herbal tea